RBC, commonly known under its previous official name RBC Roosendaal, is a football club based in Roosendaal, Netherlands. RBC currently plays in the seventh-tier Tweede Klasse after a bankruptcy in 2011, restarting the club in tenth tier Vijfde Klasse.

History

1912–1949: Formative years, mostly Tweede Klasse 
RBC, the idea of Frans Mathijsen and Anton Poldermans, was formed on 31 July 1912. The club was initially called Excelsior and was renamed VV Roosendaal in 1920. The club's present name is the result of a merger with another football team. On 16 July 1927, the club changed into Roosendaal Boys Combinatie (RBC) because of the merger with Roosendaalsche Boys.

1950–1999: Hovering between amateurs and professionals 
In 1955 the club turned professional and won the Tweede Divisie B in 1957. With the leagues restructured by the KNVB the club left professional football in 1971. Between the return to professional status in 1983 RBC was a successful amateur club.

On 23 October 1999, the club's name was officially changed to RBC Roosendaal.

2000s: Eredivisie for the first time 

In 2000 the club reached the Eredivisie for the first time just for one season. Before 2001, RBC played its league games in stadium De Luiten, which had a capacity of 2,000 seats and 5,000 standing places. In 2001, RBC moved into its new 5,000 seater stadium. RBC returned in the Eredivisie in 2002 for four seasons.

In the 2004–05 season, RBC just avoided the relegation playoff. Relegation could not be avoided a year later, with RBC finishing bottom of the Eredivisie in the 2005–06 season.

2010s: Bankruptcy and a fresh beginning 
On 8 June 2011, RBC Roosendaal was declared bankrupt after the board failed to repay the outstanding debts of €1.6 million; this led to an automatic revocation of the professional license from KNVB. With RBC Roosendaal now out of Eerste Divisie, the board started working in order to register the club to the amateur Hoofdklasse league for the 15 June deadline. On 14 June 2011, it was announced that RBC would not play in the Hoofdklasse.

On 21 September 2011, it was announced that the club would make a new start in Dutch football under the name RBC. RBC started season 2012–13 in the Vijfde Klasse, the 9th tier in Dutch football. It played its games at Sportpark Rimboe in the village of Wouwse Plantage, just south of Roosendaal. On 7 April 2013, its first promotion since their restart was confirmed after beating VV Rimboe 10–1. It played the 2013–14 season in the Vierde Klasse. One week after winning promotion, it won the championship of the division. After the end of the 2012–13 season it was announced that RBC would return to its old ground, the RBC Stadion. After finishing second two years in a row, RBC won a Vierde Klasse title in 2017 and it promoted to the Derde Klasse.

2020s: Cancelled merger with RKSV Halsteren and promotion 
At the beginning of 2020 the club was again at the brink of a bankruptcy and was exploring a merger with RKSV Halsteren. A merger agreement has been reached and was contingent to supporter input. After already agreeing on a new name and colors, the clubs decided not to merge.

In May 2020, RBC reached promotion to the Tweede Klasse after the Royal Dutch Football Association granted them the decision. RBC had won two period titles in the 2019–20 season, which had been cancelled due to the COVID-19 pandemic.

Honours
 KNVB Cup
 Runners-up: 1986
 Tweede Divisie B
 Winner: 1957
 Promoted to Eredivisie
 2000, 2002
 Sunday Amateur Champions
 1973
 Sunday Hoofdklasse B
 1975
 Eerste Klasse
 1973, 1974, 1980
 Tweede Klasse
 1972
 Vierde Klasse
 2017
 Vijfde Klasse
 2013

Results

Managers

References

 
Football clubs in the Netherlands
Association football clubs established in 1912
1912 establishments in the Netherlands
Football clubs in Roosendaal